Settrington railway station was a railway station on the Malton & Driffield Railway in North Yorkshire, England. It opened on 19 May 1853, and served the village of Settrington. It closed for passengers on 5 June 1950 and goods on 20 October 1958.

References

External links
 Settrington station on navigable 1947 O. S. map
Settrington station at The Yorkshire Wolds Railway Restoration Project

Disused railway stations in North Yorkshire
Railway stations in Great Britain opened in 1853
Railway stations in Great Britain closed in 1950
Former Malton and Driffield Junction Railway stations